Słup (pronounced swoop) may refer to the following places:
In Lower Silesian Voivodeship in southwest Poland:
Słup, Jawor County in Gmina Męcinka 
Słup, Środa Śląska County in Gmina Środa Śląska
Słup, Wołów County in Gmina Wińsko
Słup, Kuyavian-Pomeranian Voivodeship (north-central Poland)
Słup, Garwolin County in Masovian Voivodeship (east-central Poland)
Słup, Gostynin County in Masovian Voivodeship (east-central Poland)
Słup, Braniewo County in Warmian-Masurian Voivodeship (north Poland)
Słup, Działdowo County in Warmian-Masurian Voivodeship (north Poland)

See also
 Slup (disambiguation)